Al-Amin Kazeem (born 6 April 2002) is an English professional footballer who plays as a  left-back for EFL League Two club Colchester United.

Club career

Maldon & Tiptree
Al-Amin Kazeem was signed by Colchester United as a youth player in 2017. He was sent out on loan to Isthmian League side Maldon & Tiptree for the 2019-20 season. He was a part of the side that reached the  second round of the FA Cup for the first time in its history.

Colchester United
On returning from loan to Colchester United, Kazeem signed a two year contract with The U's.
Kazeem had to wait until the 2022/23 season to get his chance with the first team, making his debut in the Carabao Cup game against  Ipswich Town. He gained high praise for Colchester manager Wayne Brown, with the manager saying "I don't like to individualize after games but Al-Amin for me making his debut against a real top class (team)...I thought his one for one defending was exceptional."

Style of Play
Kazeem plays as a left-back primarily. He is very strong, quick and willing to defend, with his manager Wayne Brown stating after his debut "You've seen his fitness first and foremost but also his physical presence to get out to the ball and want to defend.
"That's a rarity nowadays, where you have people who actually want to defend."

International career
Kazeem is eligible to play for both Nigeria and England as he holds dual citizenship for both countries. He has not declared for either country as of yet.

References

External links
 

Living people
2002 births
English footballers
Association football defenders
English Football League players